Moeen Uddin Ahmed  (born 21 January 1953) is a former Bangladesh Army general and the 12th Chief of Army Staff of the Bangladesh Army from 15 June 2005 to 15 June 2009 with last one-year extension during the caretaker government led by Fakhruddin Ahmed. He has worked in Bangladesh High Commission in Islamabad, Pakistan as a Defence Attaché in the rank of brigadier, and prior to that he served as a UN Peacekeeper in United Nations Assistance Mission for Rwanda as a colonel in 1995.

Moeen Uddin Ahmed is the first army chief of staff who was commissioned in the newly formed Bangladesh Military Academy then at Comilla (now at Chittagong). He is the first regular four-star general after the liberation war, although the first official four-star general was the country's commander-in-chief of the liberation war and liberation forces M. A. G. Osmani, leading the war of independence in 1971, and the second person was Lieutenant-General Mustafizur Rahman who was promoted to full general on the day of his retirement on 23 December 2000.

Moeen was, behind the scenes, the main actor, although unlawfully, as the Chief of Army Staff during the 2006–08 Bangladeshi political crisis, violating constitution. Although the Caretaker Government had gone beyond its constitutional 3 months period it is credited for some remarkable changes like the introduction of a national identity card, activation of an anti-corruption bureau which was later given additional power and status as a commission. This military-backed government is also credited for paving the way towards independent judiciary by implementing relevant 'Mazdar Hussain Case' and forming independent judicial appointments commission. Initially, Bangladeshis were generally happy for the sense relief it gave after unprecedented anarchy on the streets of major cities but soon people started to be suspicious about the intention or objective of the government. Events like General Moeen's publication of books on politics or patronizing a political party led by Ferdous Ahmed Qureshi were not received positively at a backdrop of delivering effort in terminating the political career of former prime ministers Khaleda Zia and Sheikh Hasina.

Military career
Moeen U Ahmed completed his preliminary education Pakistan Air Force College Sargodha in the erstwhile West Pakistan. He belonged to the 16th entry (831 – Fury House), which stayed there from 1965 to 1970.

Moeen Ahmed joined BMA Comilla on 10 January 1974 and started his military career on 11 January 1975 in the rank of second lieutenant. He was commissioned in the 2nd battalion of the East Bengal Regiment (an infantry regiment of the Bangladesh army which was established in the Pakistani era). He received "Chief of Army Staff's Cane" from Bangladesh Military Academy (then at Comilla) while his batch-mate Abu Tayeb Mohammed Zahirul Alam (later became general) was awarded the "Sword of Honor". Before joining the army, he served Bangladesh Air Force for a year as a flight cadet, he was in Russia for flying training but he was dismissed due to health conditions. He started his instructional career as Weapon Training Officer and then platoon commander in BMA (then location changed to Chittagong). He received NDC (National Defence College) course after becoming Lieutenant General (as army chief), which course has been designed for colonel level officers.

Besides, commanding two infantry battalions as lieutenant colonel, he also served in Army Headquarters, Military Operations Directorate. He served as Colonel Staff of an Infantry Division. He has served in Dhaka's Defence Services Command and Staff College (DSCSC) as Directing Staff in the rank of lieutenant colonel, senior instructor of Army Wing in the rank of colonel and chief instructor in the rank of brigadier.

He was promoted to the rank of major-general in 2002 and was appointed as the commander of the 19th Division and the following year the 24th Division. He was made Chief of General Staff (CGS) in 2004, and on 15 June 2005, he was made the Chief of Army Staff by the then prime minister of Bangladesh Khaleda Zia.

On 24 May 2007 he became the first serving four star general of Bangladesh, promoted by then President Iajuddin Ahmed.

Controversy

2006–08 Bangladeshi political crisis

Moeen was the key force behind the declaration of emergency in the country on 11 January 2007 widely known as 1/11 phenomenon. He upgraded his rank from lieutenant general to general during his tenure when there was no regular government; the caretaker government was not mandated to work other than routine work and managing parliamentary elections. He also extended his one-year tenure of army chief, which is fixed for a time period. He has been accused of playing a controversial role by helping the caretaker government of Bangladesh to retain power after constitution stipulated three months duration. He has been identified as the main driving force behind the non-elected government but he has also been praised for arranging voter ID cards before 29 December 2008. He and the government has been accused of domestically and globally to de-politicise the country. Hundreds of political figures, including two ex-prime ministers, ministers, lawmakers and local government heads, have been imprisoned by the regime accusing them of corruption. Although some of these figures were notoriously corrupt, most of them do not have any specific allegation against them. The regime's anti-corruption drive has been widely praised and criticized around the globe. Reacting his political statement Sheikh Hasina said if you have the ambition to do politics come without uniform.

However, General Moeen engineered numerous controversies during his tenure. Some quarters also hold him liable for defaming the military while he was in charge of enhancing its fame.  He although had been known as a moderate-minded officer, his final role had earned him more of bad names than the opposite. Extra-military role of the army that he presided over for two years yielded many immediate troubles for the military. The most prominent being the killing of 57 military officers by the border guards of the country. General Moeen heard to have said that tragic killings of so many officers led him even to a suicide thought. The mutineers identified their grievances to have been resulted from shop-keeper role that they were told perform. This deterred their soldierly pride. Lack of far-sightedness regarding running of state-affairs channelled him to choose methods which were tremendously infantile

Political involvement
General Moeen attempted to strike deals with political leaders in order to secure support for his regime. Former president Hussain Muhammad Earshad who remained generally at unease during the rule of Sheikh Hasina and on toes during the rule of Khaled Zia, was at comfort at this time indicating a deal between the two generals It is widely perceived that they helped General Moeen in implementing 'Minus Two Formula' a popular name for an attempt made by General Moeen to end political career of former prime ministers Begum Khaled Zia and Sheikh Hasina In the book he gave formula of his own devised democracy. Such prescription on politics by a serving general is beyond his professional entitlement and thus is punishable in Bangladesh Army as with any other armies. General Moeen however could grab power with ease as he cleverly kept most structure intact including incumbent physically fragile president in power His ascending to power became further easy for the tacit international support that he enjoyed through the diplomats who were then in Dhaka. He although seemed initially to have been imitating other military dictators hoping to turn into a civilian head of state but later it was revealed that his ambition was exemplarily low. He merely wanted to go on retirement after completing his normal tenure. The fact was denuded by Indian President Pranab Mukharjee in his autobiography published in 2017. President Mukharjee explained how General Moeen lowered him before a foreign president to merely save his job and in turn how the president assured and secured his job from Sheikh Hasina. Many critics view this particular behaviour of General Moeen as treacherous. The relegation of ambition could be due to the clumsy realities that he soon started to realize that his whole move could end in an indigestible political career as opposed to his smooth military career. Moreover, contribution of diplomats in the disrepute that General Moeen earned was also substantial. Their involvement in domestic politics had gone beyond diplomatic norms in which they seemed to have connived with General Moeen which also induced in him a political ambition.

Minus-Two and Wikileaks
According to US Embassy cables:"A few months before their arrest, the then army chief Moeen U Ahmed said reforms in political parties were essential but difficult to carry out with Hasina or Khaleda in Bangladesh, according to another cable sent by the then US ambassador Patricia A Butenis on April 22, 2007."

“Moeen said senior Bangladesh Nationalist Party leaders met recently with government officials and decided that [BNP Chairperson Khaleda] Zia must go,” said the cable Butenis wrote citing discussion with Moeen. Awami League chief Hasina, who left for the US on March 15, 2007, was indefinitely barred from returning and Khaleda was expected to depart for Saudi Arabia shortly, she added.

Although the caretaker government legislations and executive actions were most repealed, and political leaders claimed it was unconstitutional, the election that was held under the caretaker government was considered legitimate by the winning party.

Family life

He is married to Naznin Moeen, and they have a son and a daughter; Nihat Ahmed and Sabrina Ahmed. Moeen is currently residing in the US with his family.

Honours

References

External links
 
 
 

1953 births
Living people
Bangladesh Army generals
Bangladeshi expatriates in Pakistan
Bangladeshi generals
Chiefs of Army Staff, Bangladesh
Non-U.S. alumni of the Command and General Staff College
Order of National Security Merit members
PAF College Sargodha alumni
Recipients of the Bangladesh National Sports Award
People from Begumganj Upazila